Jeffery Steinberg is an American historian and political scientist. From 1977 to 2015 he was the Director of Counterintelligence for the LaRouche movement publication Executive Intelligence Review (EIR).

As of 2018, Steinberg is the Executive Vice President of Pacific Tech Bridge (PTB), whose president is his former co-author Paul Goldstein. Established in April 2001, PTB is the largest shareholder of CCR Advisory Group.

Steinberg an adjunct professor in Maryland at Frederick College.

Criticism
Chip Berlet cites two articles by Steinberg as examples of "LaRouchite ... anglophobic conspiracism".

Selected publications
Articles
 "Reopen the Search for the Assassins of John F. Kennedy." Executive Intelligence Review, Vol. 19, No. 6, February 7, 1992. Full issue available.
"Bestial British intelligence of Shelburne and Bentham." Executive Intelligence Review, Vol. 21, No. 16, April 15, 1994. Full issue available.
"British Dirty Tricks against the U.S. Presidency Exposed". Executive Intelligence Review, Vol. 21, No. 16, April 15, 1994. Full issue available.
"Inslaw Brief Says OSI Tied to Theft, Murder". Executive Intelligence Review, Vol. 21, No. 16, April 15, 1994. Full issue available.
"ADL’s Foxman Blasts Rabin, Clinton, and Peace Process". Executive Intelligence Review, Vol. 21, No. 16, April 15, 1994. Full issue available.
"Convictions, No Answers in Trade Center Bombing". Executive Intelligence Review, Vol. 21, No. 16, April 15, 1994. Full issue available.
"It Didn’t Start with Abu Ghraib — Dick Cheney: Vice President for Torture and War". Executive Intelligence Review, Vol. 32, No. 44, November 11, 2005, pp. 4–15. Full Issue available.
"The Congress for Cultural Freedom: Making the Postwar World Safe for ‘Fascist Kulturkampf’". Co-authored with Steven P. Meyer. Executive Intelligence Review, Vol. 31, No. 25, June 25, 2004. Full Issue available.
"The Bizarre Case of Baroness Symons". Executive Intelligence Review, Vol. 31, No. 25, June 25, 2004. Full Issue available.
"National Security Mandarins Assail Bush and Cheney". Executive Intelligence Review, Vol. 31, No. 25, June 25, 2004. Full Issue available.
"Prince Philip Deploys Worldwide Green Terrorism". Co-authored with Rogelio A. Maduro. Executive Intelligence Review, Vol. 22, No. 3, November 11, 2005. Full issue available.
"British Oligarchs Created the Eco-Terrorist Movement". Executive Intelligence Review, Vol. 22, No. 3, November 11, 2005. Full issue available.
"Prince Philip’s Green Order of Battle". Executive Intelligence Review, Vol. 22, No. 3, November 11, 2005. Full issue available.

Essays
"George Bush, Skull & Bones and the New World Order: A New American View." Co-authored with Paul Goldstein. International Edition White Paper, April 1991.

Books
Dope, Inc.: Britain's Opium War Against the U.S. by a U.S. Labor Party Investigating Team, co-directed with Konstandinos Kalimtgis & David Goldman.

Lectures
"Britain’s Invisible Empire." Schiller Institute ICLC Labor Day Conference. Reston, Virginia. September 1997.

Interviews
 "'President Kennedy Was Killed by a Murder, Inc.'" Interview with Col. L. Fletcher Prouty. Executive Intelligence Review, Vol. 19, No. 6, February 7, 1992, pp. 34-38.  Full issue available.

See also
Executive Intelligence Review
Lyndon LaRouche

External links
”Biographies of Some People Who Have Appeared on The LaRouche Connection: Jeffrey Steinberg“. 2002. larouchepub.com.

Notes and references

Living people
Year of birth missing (living people)
LaRouche movement